Catocala kuangtungensis is a moth of the family Erebidae. It is found in China (Guangdong, Hunan, Guizhou, Jangxi, Shaanxi, Sichuan) and Japan (Honshu, Shikoku, Kyushu, Yakushima).

The wingspan is about 63 mm.

Subspecies
Catocala kuangtungensis kuangtungensis
Catocala kuangtungensis sugii Ishizuka, 2002
Catocala kuangtungensis chohien Ishizuka, 2002 (Shaanxi, Sichuan)

Catocala dejeani is sometimes also included in the present species.

References

External links
Catocala of Asia

kuangtungensis
Moths of Japan
Moths of Asia
Moths described in 1931